Carleton Crawford is a former acting chair for the Republican Party of Minnesota. He assumed the role when Jennifer Carnahan resigned under pressure from state party officials on August 19, 2021, amid several scandals, including the Anton Lazzaro sex trafficking arrest and scandal. He had previously served as the deputy chair for the Republican Party of Minnesota.

References 

Living people
Minnesota Republicans
Year of birth missing (living people)